This list of University of Texas at Austin buildings catalogs the currently existing structures on the campus of The University of Texas at Austin in Austin, Texas. Buildings are categorized based on their current functions and characteristics.

Academic facilities

Administrative buildings

Athletic and outdoor recreation facilities

Museums

Residential buildings

University Apartments

There are also three off-campus apartment complexes owned and operated by the university. They are Brackenridge Apartments, Colorado Apartments, and Gateway Apartments. Eligible students include graduate students and undergraduate students who each have at least 30 credit hours and are in good academic standing. Brackenridge apartments is Family Housing; Colorado and Gateway Apartments are assigned by the bedroom to UT Austin Students.

Brackenridge Apartments is a part of the  UT Austin Brackenridge tract, located along Lake Austin and Lady Bird Lake in western Austin. As of 2007 the units at Brackenridge Apartments do not have washers, dryers, and dishwashers. As of that year some units at Brackenridge do not have central air conditioning. As of that year the monthly rent for a three bedroom apartment was $715. The university provides shuttle buses to the UT Austin campus. At Brackenridge Apartments many neighbors know each other and area children interact with one another. Many residents originate from other countries.

Colorado Apartments has 510 units. The rent at Colorado, as of 2007, was half of the Austin apartment market rate. In 2007 540 students lived in the complex; about 70% come from outside of the United States. Of the spouses of the students, many are unable to work because their visas do not permit them to work.

The Colorado and Brackenridge units have painted concrete panel and brick exteriors, colored orange.

The Colorado Apartments area includes a gazebo, picnic tables, and a soccer (football) field. A grocery store is located in proximity to the complex.

All three apartments are within the Austin Independent School District and are zoned to Mathews Elementary School, O. Henry Middle School, and Austin High School. Many children of the UT Austin students living at Brackenridge and Colorado attend Mathews Elementary. School buses come to Brackenridge to pick up students to go to Mathews. The school is considered by the area community to be high achieving. Mathews has a racially/ethnically diverse student body. The school offers Chinese language classes. The school opened circa 1916.. In 2007 there were about 400 students, from over 40 countries, with 125 from the UT complexes.

History of university family apartments
The Colorado Apartments opened in 1962.

In 1989 the City of Austin and UT Austin entered into an agreement, allowing UT Austin the option of redeveloping the parcels of land housing the university family apartments. The agreement specifies that the parcels may be redeveloped to house residential, retail, and/or other commercial properties. The agreement regarding the parcel with the Colorado Apartments went into effect in 1999. The agreement regarding Brackenridge Apartments was scheduled to go into effect in 2009.

In 2005 the University of Texas Board of Regents offered the parcels of land with the Colorado Apartments as a possible site for the location of the George W. Bush Presidential Library; ultimately Southern Methodist University received the library. As of the northern hemisphere spring semester of 2007, 268 students were on a waiting list to get into units at Brackenridge Apartments. In August of that year, over 500 students submitted an intention to move into the units. Around 2007 a task force recommended selling the tract including the Brackenridge Apartments and the Colorado Apartments to developers, who would replace the apartments with commercial property. The options presented by the task force were keeping the housing at the same location, moving the housing to a new location, and giving a housing subsidy to students to pay for the costs of housing at third party locations. The graduate student community states that they preferred keeping the apartments where they were and did not support the housing subsidy idea. The community of Mathews Elementary believed that if the UT student housing was removed, the community would lose the international student culture that comes with the children who live on the complex.

When asked by the Austin American-Statesman. about the details of the recommendations of the planners to redevelop Gateway Apartments to be a larger complex and replacing the functions of Brackenridge and Colorado apartments, William Powers Jr., the UT Austin president, said that the components of the new housing plan that would be essential for the students would include having "garden-style" apartment units instead of high-rise dormitory units, having facilities for children, and continued zoning to Mathews Elementary.

Other facilities

See also
 West Campus, Austin, Texas - This includes details of privately-operated, non-UT affiliated buildings which house University of Texas students, including the former Goodall-Wooten

References

External links 

Interactive map of UT Austin

University of Texas at Austin buildings
Texas at Austin, University of
 
University of Texas at Austin